Jeffrey Scott Horton (born July 13, 1957) is an American football coach.  He is currently  the running backs coach at San Diego State University. He was the interim head coach at the University of Minnesota, having replaced Tim Brewster, who was fired midway through the Golden Gophers' 2010 season.  Horton previously served as the head coach at the University of Nevada, Reno in 1993 and at the University of Nevada, Las Vegas from 1994 to 1998.  From 2006 to 2008, he a special assistant/offense and assistant offensive line coach for the St. Louis Rams of the National Football League (NFL), where he worked under head coach Scott Linehan.  Horton coached the quarterbacks for the NFL's Detroit Lions in 2009.

Coaching career

Early coaching career
Horton's first coaching job was as a graduate assistant for Minnesota in 1984 under Lou Holtz. The following year, he joined his alma mater as assistant in Reno. In 1990 and 1991, he was the wide receivers coach. In 1992, he left to become the Wide Receivers coach at UNLV.

Head coach at Nevada
After the 1992 football season ended, Wolf Pack head coach Chris Ault stepped down to focus on his duties as the university's athletic director.  Horton was Ault's hand-picked successor, and he returned from Las Vegas to take over as head coach of the Wolf Pack. Horton lead Nevada to a 7–4 record and a second-place finish in the Big West Conference.

Head coach at UNLV
Following the 1993 season, Horton accepted the head coaching position at in-state rival UNLV, a move commonly referred to as the "Red Defection" by Wolf Pack fans. His first season, 1994, the Rebels won the Big West title and the Las Vegas Bowl, winning Horton that conference's Coach of the Year award.

However, this would not last, and Horton would win only six more games over the next three years. He was fired after the Rebels finished 0–11 in the 1998 season, the only winless season in school history until the 2020 UNLV team finished 0–6 under head coach Marcus Arroyo.

Wisconsin
After being fired, he was hired as the quarterbacks coach for the Wisconsin Badgers. The quarterbacks during his tenure (Jim Sorgi, Brooks Bollinger, and John Stocco), rank first, second, and fourth in Badgers history in passing yards.

St. Louis Rams
Horton was hired as the special assistant/offense to the St. Louis Rams. In that position, he assisted head coach Scott Linehan with administrative duties, offensive play-calling, and preparation.

Detroit Lions
Horton spent one season (2009) with the Detroit Lions as the quarterbacks coach.

Minnesota
Horton was hired by Minnesota coach Tim Brewster in January 2010, after Jedd Fisch left to be the quarterbacks coach for the NFL Seattle Seahawks.  On October 17, 2010, Brewster was relieved of his head coaching duties. Horton was tapped to replace Brewster on an interim basis. He went 2–3 as coach, beating the Iowa Hawkeyes on November 27 to win the Floyd of Rosedale trophy. It was the first trophy-game win for the Gophers since before Brewster took over.

San Diego State 
Horton was the running backs coach and formerly the assistant head coach and offensive coordinator at San Diego State University.

Head coaching record

Notes

References

External links
 San Diego State profile

1957 births
Living people
Detroit Lions coaches
Minnesota Golden Gophers football coaches
Nevada Wolf Pack football coaches
San Diego State Aztecs football coaches
Sportspeople from Arlington, Texas
St. Louis Rams coaches
University of Nevada, Reno alumni
University of San Francisco alumni
UNLV Rebels football coaches
Wisconsin Badgers football coaches